The 01045 / 01046 Deekshabhoomi Express via Latur is the Express trains which connect Shri Chhatrapati Shahu Maharaj Terminus, Kolhapur, Maharashtra and Dhanbad Junction,  Jharkhand. This train runs via Latur from 19 February 2021. It runs with an average speed of  during its journey and covers 38 halts and 337 intermediate stations.

The trains stop at Miraj Junction, Kavathe Mahankal, Dhalgaon, Pandharpur, Kurduvadi, Barsi Town, Usmanabad, Latur, Latur road Junction, Parli Vaijnath, Parbhani Junction, Purna Junction, Hazur Sahib Nanded, Kinwat, Adilabad, Wani, Majri Junction, Sevagram, Nagpur, Amla Junction, Betul, Ghoradongri, Itarsi Junction, Jabalpur, Katni, Satna, Prayagraj Cheoki, Deen Dayaj Upadhyay Junction, Bhabua Road, Sasaram Junction, Dehri On Sone, Anugrah Narayan Road, Gaya Junction, Koderma and Parasnath.

Coaches
The 01045/01046 Deekshabhoomi Express presently has  1 AC, 10 Sleeper class, 3 General Unreserved coaches and 2 SLR coaches.

Route
SCSMT Kolhapur
 
 
 
 
 
 
 
 
 
 
 
 
 
 
 Prayagraj Junction
 
 Pandit Deen Dayal Upadhyay Junction

Direction reversal
It reverses the direction 3 times,

 Miraj Junction railway station
 Latur Road junction railway station 
 Parli Vaijnath railway station

Traction
It is hauled by a Diesel Loco Shed, Pune-based WDM-3A / WDP-4D locomotive from KOP to PRYJ & handing over to a Diesel Loco Shed, Itarsi-based WDM-3D / WDP-4D locomotive from PRYJ to DHN and vice versa.

See also
 Deekshabhoomi

References

External links
11045 Deekshabhoomi Express Route Time Table
11046 Deekshabhoomi Express Route Time Table

Named passenger trains of India
Rail transport in Jharkhand
Rail transport in Madhya Pradesh
Rail transport in Maharashtra
Rail transport in Uttar Pradesh
Transport in Kolhapur
Express trains in India